Roman Pryma (born 6 November 1981) is a Ukrainian biathlete. He competed in the men's sprint event at the 2002 Winter Olympics.

References

1981 births
Living people
Ukrainian male biathletes
Olympic biathletes of Ukraine
Biathletes at the 2002 Winter Olympics
Sportspeople from Chernihiv